Acontiophorum is a genus of sea anemones of the family Acontiophoridae.

Species 
The following species are recognized:

References 

Acontiophoridae
Hexacorallia genera